Americium(III) nitrate is an inorganic compound, a salt of americium and nitric acid with the chemical formula Am(NO3)3. The compound is soluble in water and radioactive.

Synthesis
Reaction of americium and nitric acid:
8Am + 30HNO3 ->  8Am(NO3)3 + 3N2O + 15H2O

Chemical properties
Americium(III) nitrate thermally decomposes to form americium(III) oxide.

It forms crystal hydrates.

References

Americium compounds
Nitrates